Vocal mimicry may refer to the following:

 use of the human voice to mimic other sounds, including
kouji in Chinese performance
vocalized sound effects
bird calls such as duck calls
vocal percussion such as beatboxing
xenoglossia
 mimicry of the human voice by birds or other animals